Odoratus is a Latin adjective meaning "fragrant, perfumed" (feminine form odorata, neuter form odoratum), and may refer to:

Aerides odorata, a species of orchid
Aglaia odorata, a species of plant in the family Meliaceae 
Anthoxanthum odoratum, known as sweet vernal grass, holy grass, or buffalo grass
Ascalapha odorata bears the common name black witch
Bulbophyllum odoratum, a species of orchid
Cedrela odorata (Spanish cedar, Mexican cedar, cigar-box cedar, cedro-cheiroso)
Chromolaena odorata, a shrub of the sunflower family native to North America
Cyperus odoratus, a species of sedge known by the common names fragrant flatsedge and rusty flatsedge
Eucalyptus odorata, a small to medium-sized tree native to south eastern Australia
Galium odoratum (woodruff, wild baby's breath), a flowering perennial plant in the family Rubiaceae, native to Europe, North Africa and western Asia
Henriettella odorata, a species of plant in the family Melastomataceae
Hopea odorata, a species of plant in the family Dipterocarpaceae
Hymenoxys odorata, a species of flowering plant in the daisy family known as bitter rubberweed and western bitterweed
Lupinus odoratus, is a spring wildflower found in the central and western Mojave Desert in the southwestern United States
Mallotus odoratus, synonym of Mallotus peltatus, a species of plant in the family Euphorbiaceae
Mangifera odorata (also called Kuwini mango, Saipan mango, or fragrant mango) is a species of plant in the family Anacardiaceae
Morrenia odorata (latexplant, strangler vine) is an ornamental plant in the family Apocynaceae, which is native to Brazil
Nymphaea odorata, a flower also known as the fragrant water lily and beaver root
Nymphaea odorata subsp. odorata, a subspecies of Nymphaea odorata found in the United States
Nymphaea odorata subsp. tuberosa, a subspecies of Nymphaea odorata found in the eastern United States
Odontoglossum odoratum, a species of orchid
Odoratus, an extinct genus of brachiopod
Oenothera odorata, a perennial plant in the family Onagraceae native to South America
Persicaria odorata, also known as Vietnamese coriander, an herb used in Southeast Asian cuisine
Polygonatum odoratum, a species of plant commonly known as angular Solomon's-seal or scented Solomon's-seal
Prunus odorata, synonym of Prunus mahaleb subsp. mahaleb, a subspecies of plant in the family Rosaceae
Psydrax odorata, also known as alaheʻe in Hawaiian, a flowering shrub in the family Rubiaceae
Rondeletia odorata (the fragrant Panama rose) is originally from Panama and Cuba
Rubus odoratus (purple-flowering raspberry, flowering raspberry, or Virginia raspberry) is a species of Rubus, native to eastern North America
Sternotherus odoratus or stinkpot is a species of small turtle native to southeastern Canada and much of the eastern United States
Tephrosia odorata, a species of legume in the family Fabaceae 
Utricularia odorata, a medium-sized, probably perennial carnivorous plant in the family Lentibulariaceae
Vatica odorata, a tree in the family Dipterocarpaceae
Viola odorata, a violet in the family Violaceae